Douglas Harry Coghill (6 August 1855 – 13 December 1928) was MP for Newcastle-under-Lyme from 1886 to 1892 and then Stoke-upon-Trent from 1895 to 1906. He was elected as a Liberal Unionist in 1886 and 1895 but had joined their  Conservative coalition ally in time for the 1900 General Election. Coghill was defeated in 1906 and did not stand again for political office.

References

External links 
 

1855 births
1928 deaths
People from Stoke-on-Trent
Members of the Parliament of the United Kingdom for Newcastle-under-Lyme
Liberal Unionist Party MPs for English constituencies
Conservative Party (UK) MPs for English constituencies
UK MPs 1886–1892
UK MPs 1895–1900
UK MPs 1900–1906